"Another Me" is a song by American DJ and record producer Seven Lions, Canadian electronic music producer Excision, and dubstep musician Wooli, featuring American singer-songwriter Dylan Matthew. Seven Lions' record label Ophelia released it on 30 August 2019.

Background and release
The then-unknown song debuted during Seven Lions' DJ set at Electric Forest Festival in late-June, 2019, though no release date was confirmed. In late-August, Seven Lions announced the song as "Another Me" on Twitter.

On August 30, 2019, the song was released as a digital download on international digital stores through American record label Ophelia, as well as being released through various music streaming services.

Critical reception
"Another Me" was well-received by most critics. Various electronic music journalists noted the song's combination of melodic dubstep and riddim, with Jessica Mao of Dancing Astronaut and Matthew Meadow of Your EDM both writing, that its first drop can be more suited for fans of melodic dubstep and its second drop as being more oriented towards bass music fans, with the specific style and elements associated with each of the artists being audibly prevalent. EDMTunes''' Katie Steensma stated that the song would also be pleasing to "vocal-lovers" and that the song would "no doubt" be resonating with "the established electricity of the crowd." Writing for EDM.com'', Niko Sani described the song as "everything fans of each artist could want and more" and would "become a favourite in the bass music scene", praising its bass, drums, lyrics and synths.

Charts

Release history

References

External links
Lyrics of this song at Genius

2019 singles
2019 songs
Dubstep songs
Seven Lions songs